Langa Mudongo (born 2 May 1955) is a Botswana middle-distance runner. He competed in the men's 800 metres at the 1980 Summer Olympics.

References

External links
 

1955 births
Living people
Athletes (track and field) at the 1980 Summer Olympics
Botswana male middle-distance runners
Olympic athletes of Botswana
Place of birth missing (living people)